"Fire Brigade" is a song written by Roy Wood and performed by The Move. Released as the group's fourth single in Britain in February 1968, it reached No. 3 in the UK Singles Chart. A cover version was recorded by The Fortunes and released as a single in the US, but did not chart.

According to Wood, he wrote the song in a single overnight session after manager Tony Secunda told the band, who had just finished playing a concert, that he had a studio session lined up for the next morning and that they needed to record a single. Since Wood did not have any songs ready that he thought would be a good single, the rest of the Move left him alone in a hotel room (which they normally doubled up on) to write one. The song uses a riff derived from "Somethin' Else" by Eddie Cochran, a work that Wood would continue to reference throughout his career.

The book included with the 4-CD boxed set Anthology 1966–1972, released in October 2008, noted that sessions for the song began on 16 November 1967 at Olympic Studios in Barnes, London. Anthology includes both the finished version which was released as a single, as well as an early, previously unreleased version with Matthew Fisher of Procol Harum on piano. An earlier retrospective release, the 3-CD Movements: 30th Anniversary Anthology, from 1997, also has two slightly different recordings - the final version, and an undubbed one, before backing vocals, tambourine and opening 'fire engine' sound effects were added.

Glen Matlock of the Sex Pistols said some years later that the guitar on the song had strongly influenced the opening riff of their single "God Save the Queen".

"Fire Brigade" influenced "Firehouse" from the self-titled debut album by Kiss.

Personnel
 Roy Wood – guitars, lead vocals
 Carl Wayne – vocals (bridge)
 Trevor Burton – guitars
 Ace Kefford – bass
 Bev Bevan – drums

Charts

References

The Move songs
1968 singles
Songs written by Roy Wood
Regal Zonophone Records singles
A&M Records singles
1968 songs